Ozothamnus cupressoides  is an aromatic shrub species, endemic to Australia. Common names include scaly everlasting, lattice everlasting or kerosene bush. It grows to between 0.5 and 1 metre in height and has white-tomentose branchlets. The scale-like leaves are 1 to 3 mm long and 0.5 to 1 mm wide. These are green  on the upper surface, and white tomentose below. The flower heads  appear in dense clusters in summer and autumn The species occurs in boggy sites and subalpine heathland in New South Wales and Victoria.  It was first formally described in 2010 in the journal Muelleria.

References

cupressoides
Asterales of Australia
Flora of New South Wales
Flora of Victoria (Australia)
Plants described in 2010
Taxa named by Christopher Francis Puttock